This is part of a list of Statutes of New Zealand for the period of the United Government of New Zealand up to and including part of the first year of the Liberal–Reform coalition Government of New Zealand.

1920s

1929  

 Associated Churches of Christ Church Property Act 
 Auckland City Sinking Funds and Empowering Act 
 Bluff Harbour Reclamation and Leasing and Empowering Act 
 Christchurch City Electricity and General Empowering Act 
 Hawke's Bay County, Hastings Borough and Havelock, North Town Board Empowering Act 
 Lyttelton Harbour Board Reclamation Validation Act 
 Pacific Cable Sale Authorization Act 
 Rest-homes Act 
 Sumner Borough Land Vesting Act 
 Taupiri Drainage and River District Act  Amended: 1931/37/43
 Transport Department Act 
Plus 26 Acts amended

1930s

1930  
 Auckland City Council and Motuihi Island Domain Board Empowering Act 
 Canterbury Agricultural College Act  Amended: 1934/49/54/58
 Census Postponement Act 
 Disabled Soldiers' Civil Re-establishment Act 
 Electric-power Boards and Supply Authorities Association Act 
 Hawke's Bay County Empowering Act 
 Invercargill City Fire and Accident Insurance Fund Empowering Act  Amended: 1952
 Kawarau Gold Mining Amalgamation Act 
 Kirkpatrick Masonic Institute Empowering Act  Amended: 1983
 National Art Gallery and Dominion Museum Act  Amended: 1933/36/56/58/67
 Patea Borough Council Empowering Act 
 Rotorua Borough Empowering Act 
 Unemployment Act  Amended: 1931/32/34
 Waiapu County Council Empowering Act 
Plus 32 Acts amended

1931  
 Air Navigation Act 
 Auckland Harbour Board and other Local Bodies Empowering Act 
 Auckland Harbour Bridge Empowering Act 
 Broadcasting Act  Amended: 1934/37/59/60/77/79/81/82/85/88/89/90/91/93/96/98/99/2000/01/03/04/07
 Dominion Life Assurance Office of New Zealand, Limited Act 
 Hawke's Bay Earthquake Act  Amended: 1962
 Hawke's Bay Earthquake Relief Funds Act 
 Licensing Poll Postponement Act 
 Mortgagors Relief Act  Amended: 1931
 Mountain Guides Act 
 Native Purposes Act 
 New Lynn Sewerage Validation Act 
 Rent Restriction Extension Act 
 Rotorua Borough Reclamation Empowering Act 
 South Wairarapa River Board Empowering Act 
 Trading-coupons Act 
 Transport Licensing Act  Amended: 1935/36/49
Plus 23 Acts amended

See also 
The above list may not be current and will contain errors and omissions. For more accurate information try:
 Walter Monro Wilson, The Practical Statutes of New Zealand, Auckland: Wayte and Batger 1867
 The Knowledge Basket: Legislation NZ
 New Zealand Legislation Includes some Imperial and Provincial Acts. Only includes Acts currently in force, and as amended.
 Legislation Direct List of statutes from 2003 to order

Lists of statutes of New Zealand